Walter George Frank Phillimore, 1st Baron Phillimore,  (21 November 1845 – 13 March 1929), known as Sir Walter Phillimore, 2nd Baronet, from 1885 to 1918, was a British lawyer and judge.

Biography
Phillimore was the son of Sir Robert Phillimore, 1st Baronet, and of Charlotte Phillimore (née Denison). His mother was the sister of Evelyn Denison, 1st Viscount Ossington and of Edward Denison.

He was educated at Westminster School and Christ Church, Oxford, where he held a studentship. At Oxford he took Firsts in Classics, Law, and Modern History, was Secretary and Treasurer of the Oxford Union, and was awarded the Vinerian Scholarship. He was also elected a fellow of All Souls College, Oxford. He was called to the bar by the Middle Temple in 1868, and joined the Western Circuit.

Phillimore was an eminent ecclesiastical lawyer, and mostly practiced in front of ecclesiastical and admiralty courts, seldom appearing in front of the common law courts. He was involved in many famous ecclesiastical cases, often related to ritualistic controversies. He also gave the opinion in the 1884 case of the Home Office Baby.

In 1872 he was appointed Chancellor of the Diocese of Lincoln. In 1883 he was given a patent of precedence (the last ever granted) giving him the same privileges as a Queen's Counsel, though he was never appointed a QC. In 1885, upon his father's death, he succeeded to the Phillimore baronetcy.

He was a Judge of the High Court of Justice from 1897 to 1913 and a Lord Justice of Appeal from 1913 to 1916. In 1902 he represented the United Kingdom at a meeting of an International Maritime Committee in Hamburg, which debated a draft treaty relating to a uniform law concerning collisions and maritime salvage.

In 1913, he was admitted to the Privy Council and on 2 July 1918 he was raised to the peerage as Baron Phillimore, of Shiplake in the County of Oxford.

In 1918 he chaired the Phillimore Committee, appointed by the British government to report on proposals for a League of Nations. The committee was established in January 1918 after being suggested to Arthur Balfour by Lord Robert Cecil.

Lord Phillimore died in London in March 1929, aged 83, and was succeeded in his titles by his son Godfrey.

Arms

References

Bibliography
 Kidd, Charles, Williamson, David (editors). Debrett's Peerage and Baronetage (1990 edition). New York: St Martin's Press, 1990.
 .
 W. A. B. (1928) "The Right Hon. Baron Phillimore of Shiplake, Baronet, PC, DCL, LLD, JP", Transactions of the Grotius Society, Vol. 14, Problems of Peace and War, Papers Read before the Society in the Year 1928, ppv-ix.

External links

1845 births
1929 deaths
Barons in the Peerage of the United Kingdom
19th-century English judges
20th-century English judges
Law lords
Knights Grand Cross of the Order of the British Empire
Members of Kensington Metropolitan Borough Council
Members of the Judicial Committee of the Privy Council
Members of the Privy Council of the United Kingdom
People educated at Westminster School, London
Alumni of Christ Church, Oxford
Fellows of All Souls College, Oxford
Members of the Middle Temple
Lords Justices of Appeal
Barons created by George V
Honorary Fellows of the British Academy
Baronets in the Baronetage of the United Kingdom